Synurbization refers to the effects of urbanization on the adaptation of wildlife, and how animals that live in urban environments versus nature environments differ. Urbanization, in terms of ecology, means developmental changes to the environment. These changes are often in benefit to humans. When applying synurbization to circumstances of urbanization where species have adapted, that adaptation does not occur by accident. Animals making adaptations to the environment change are often only doing so because of urban expansion into their current environments—e.g., the expansion of cities removing forested areas occupied species such as birds. Urbanization causes synurbization. Animals change behaviour as required for survival. Those species that better adapt and have favourable variations in traits ultimately have higher fitness. However, while some of the behavioural adaptations are favourable for the species, consequences stem from the urbanization and impact these species. In some cases, even humans are victims to these consequences.

Changes in the behaviour
When compared to species that live in natural environments, the differences between those species and the urbanized species is clear. These adaptational changes in behaviour have been labeled as "urban wildlife syndrome" since the changes in one species is not exclusive to that one species, instead, it has been visible over multiple species.

Changes in behaviour have been documented in many species responding to urban expansion into their habitats.

Population density increase 
Including the correlation between other variables, such as aggression and wariness, multiple studies show a population density increase. Population density is the population number in one unit of area at a given time. The increase in population density has been highly correlated with the reduction in species wariness, as well as their intra-specie aggression. As population density increases, wariness of humans decreases- this is known as a negative correlation. As population density increases, intra-specific aggression increases- this is known as a positive correlation. Park spaces in urbanized spaces may contribute to this population density increase. These parks allow for species to mate, and access and be fed food by humans, with little to no predation.

Decreased wariness 
Wariness is the observable fear that animals feel when encountering humans. They may be startled or retreat rapidly. Previous research hypothesized that population density is the main influence on this behavioural change. While coexisting with humans, it is logical that over time, animals become accustomed to human presence. However, not only are these animals less startled by humans, but they also are willing to approach and physically interact with humans. This tameness results from human willingness to feed these animals. Easy access to food changes natural behaviour in rural animal populations.

Increased intra-specific aggression 
Intra-specific aggression is the aggression toward members of their own species. Similar to reduced wariness, the increase in intra-specific aggression may be the result of the increase in population density. Having more members of a species in a smaller unit area, all whilst still competing for the same resources is likely to have the outcome of higher aggression levels.

Increased lifespan 

Animals living in urbanized populations are on average living substantially longer than their rural species populations. This is due to many factors such as:

 Reduced migrations- The climate conditions and access to food seasonally has reduced the need for migratory species to leave during the colder seasons. Migratory species also face dangerous conditions and require high energy levels to endue a migration; without this need, the animals are being more safe and saving themselves time, and energy be remaining sedentary.
 Longer breeding season- The sedentary lifestyle from the reduction of migration, as well as the preferential climate, allows the animals to breed for much longer periods of time compared to the rural populations.
 Access to food- Since these animals live in urban areas, they encounter humans daily. Whether these are humans in a public park, a street, or even their own backyard; where there is a human, there is likely food. The reduction of wariness is favourable to animals in this sense because they can approach people in parks or the streets, and as a result gain food in return. Many people also have feeders in their backyard; another way for animals to easily access food. 
 Favourable conditions- easier access to food, an abundance of sheltered areas, low predation, and favourable climates.

Change in the circadian rhythm 
Some hypothesize that changes in circadian rhythm are because of artificial light from street lights, cars, homes, and large signs.

Change in nesting habits 
In birds specifically, those in urban environments, use much different nesting materials than their counterpart rural populations. Birds in rural areas use materials such as twigs, grass, moss, and other naturally occurring materials for their nests, whereas urbanized birds have less access to these types of materials and have had to adapt to using other materials. Instead of nesting in trees, they can find shelter in the infrastructure of buildings and bridges, and public parks.

Consequences of urban development
The main consequence of urban development for wildlife is a decrease in its species and ecological diversity. The growing tendency towards synurbization observed in birds and mammals is a chance for enriching diversity of urban wildlife. Synurbization of some species could cause practical problems when their populations grow to high concentrations. An example of such problems is Canada goose in North American cities.

References

Ecological processes
Neologisms